Éric Bernard (born 24 August 1964) is a retired French Formula One racing driver, who drove in Formula One from 1989 to 1994 for the Ligier, Larrousse and Lotus teams. His best finish in Formula One was third place at the German Grand Prix in 1994. After his Formula One career ended, he raced sportscars.

Early career
Bernard was born in Martigues, near Marseille. He started karting in 1976 and in the seven years that followed, won four French titles. In 1983 he attended racing school at Paul Ricard and was one of the finalists at the Volant Elf competition. He beat Jean Alesi and Bertrand Gachot to the prize, earning himself a fully sponsored drive in Formula Renault for 1984. He finished sixth in the series, but won the following year, and entering French Formula Three in 1986. He won the series the following year, finishing in second place for the championship, behind his old rival, Alesi. In 1988 he entered Formula 3000. He drove the initial part of the season for the Ralt Team before switching to Bromley Motorsport which ran a Reynard chassis. His best finish that year was second at the Dijon-Prenois and placed 9th in the championship with 13 points. For 1989, he drove for the DAMS team, scoring one win and placing 3rd in the championship with 25 points.

Formula One
In mid-1989, Bernard was called up to the French Larrousse Formula One team for the French Grand Prix, replacing Yannick Dalmas. On his debut, he ran as high as 5th place, and was still in 7th when his Lamborghini V12 engine failed a few laps from the end (Alesi also debuted at the race for Tyrrell, running as high as 2nd before finally finishing 4th). Bernard stood in again at the following British Grand Prix, before returning to his Formula 3000 commitments with DAMS.

Bernard was rewarded with a full-season drive for Larrousse in 1990. He took his first point for 6th place at the Monaco Grand Prix, and his best result came at Silverstone in the British Grand Prix, where he took 4th place. He elected to stay on at Larrousse for the 1991 season, but the team were in trouble, losing their Lamborghini engines to the quasi-works Modena team, having their 1990 points stripped by the FIA, and also losing sponsors. Bernard took 6th place in the Mexican Grand Prix, which was the last points finish for Larrousse with Lola Cars, but slipped back down the field, failing to qualify for the first time in his career at the Portuguese Grand Prix - partially due to a bereavement. Worse was to come, however, when Bernard broke his leg in the first practice session for the Japanese Grand Prix.

Bernard fought back to fitness, and for the 1993 season his old sponsors Elf managed to get him into a test driver seat for the Ligier team. The two-year testing contract paid off, as a team backer was jailed for fraud before the 1994 season, and the reduced budget saw Bernard promoted to a race seat, alongside rookie Olivier Panis. Sadly for Bernard, Panis largely outpaced him, and the team's Renault V10 engine was counterweighted by the team using a "B"-spec version of the 1993 JS39 chassis - by this time a very unusual practice in Formula One which greatly harmed competitiveness. Bernard took third place in the high-attrition German Grand Prix, but by the European Grand Prix he was dropped in order to accommodate Johnny Herbert. He was engaged by Herbert's previous team, Team Lotus, to fill the seat at the European GP, but it was to be his last F1 drive, with Mika Salo taking over later in the season. For 1995, he was linked to a return to Larrousse, but the team folded before the season began.

Sportscars
Bernard moved to sportscars, enjoying considerable success in GT and ALMS series.

Racing record

Career summary

Complete International Formula 3000 results
(key) (Races in bold indicate pole position; races in italics indicate fastest lap.)

Complete Formula One results
(key)

Complete 24 Hours of Le Mans results

References
Profile at www.grandprix.com

1964 births
Living people
French racing drivers
French Formula Renault 2.0 drivers
French Formula One drivers
FIA GT Championship drivers
Larrousse Formula One drivers
Ligier Formula One drivers
Team Lotus Formula One drivers
24 Hours of Le Mans drivers
Sportspeople from Marseille
International Formula 3000 drivers
American Le Mans Series drivers
Dakar Rally drivers
DAMS drivers
Italian Formula Three Championship drivers
French Formula Three Championship drivers
David Price Racing drivers